Pa Phai railway station is a railway station located in Tanyong Limo Subdistrict, Ra-ngae District, Narathiwat.

South Thailand insurgency events 
 On 30 March 2007, a separatist bomb exploded in a ditch in front of the station. No one was injured and train services could stop or pass the station as normal.

Services 
 Local No. 447/448 Surat Thani-Sungai Kolok-Surat Thani
 Local No. 451/452 Nakhon Si Thammarat-Sungai Kolok-Nakhon Si Thammarat
 Local No. 453/454 Yala-Sungai Kolok-Yala
 Local No. 463/464 Phatthalung-Sungai Kolok-Phatthalung

References 

 
 

Railway stations in Thailand